The 62nd District of the Iowa House of Representatives in the state of Iowa.

Current elected officials
Ras Smith is the representative currently representing the district.

Past representatives
The district has previously been represented by:
 Philip B. Hill, 1971–1973
 Norman G. Jesse, 1973–1981
 Jo Ann Trucano, 1981–1983
 William R. Sullivan, 1983–1987
 Philip Wise, 1987–1993
 William Bernau, 1993–1999
 Dennis Parmenter, 1999–2001
 Barbara Finch, 2001–2003
 Frank Chiodo, 2003–2005
 Bruce Hunter, 2003–2013
 Deborah Berry, 2013–2017
 Ras Smith, 2017–present

References

062